Simon Fellows is a British film director.

Filmography
Jump (2000)
Blessed (2004) 
7 Seconds (2005)
Second in Command (2006)
Until Death (2007)
Malice in Wonderland (2009)
A Dark Place (2018)

References

External links

British film directors
Living people
Year of birth missing (living people)
British screenwriters
British film producers
British cinematographers